Megalodon Collective (initiated 2014 in Trondheim, Norway) is a jazz septet based in Trondheim, with Norwegian and Swedish musicians.

Biography 
The band members all have a background from the jazz program at Norwegian University of Science and Technology, and are sentral on the Trondheim jazz scene. The debut album Megalodon (2015) was well received with a nomination for the Norwegian grammy, and followed by extensive touring.

Band members 
 Karl Hjalmar Nyberg - saxophone
 Martin Myhre Olsen - saxophone
 Petter Kraft - saxophone
 Karl Bjorå - guitar
 Aaron Mandelmann - upright bass
 Andreas Winther - drums
 Henrik Lødøen - drums

Discography 

2015: Megalodon (Gigafon)
2017: Animals (Jazzland)
2019: The Triumph (Jazzland)

Honors 
2016: Awarded the Jazzintro "This year's young jazz musicians" at Moldejazz
2016: Nominated to the Norwegian grammys for debut album

References

External links 

Norwegian jazz ensembles
Norwegian experimental musical groups
Musical groups established in 2014
Musical groups from Trondheim
Septets
Jazzland Recordings (1997) artists
2014 establishments in Norway